Waterfront Shipping is a shipping company that operates six clean product tankers each at about 84,000 deadweight tonnes. The company is based in Oslo, Norway and is a subsidiary of Kistefos. Commercial management is performed by Dampskibsselskabet TORM of Denmark while Tesma Denmark performs technical management.

History
The company was founded in 1988 as Wind Product Tankers, later changing name to Gyda Shipping and Tschudi & Eitzen Shipping until it took the present name in 1997 when it also was listed on the Oslo Stock Exchange. In 2000 the company was delisted and converted from an ASA to an AS and became a subsidiary of Kistefos.

Shipping companies of Norway
Tanker shipping companies
Transport companies established in 1988
Companies based in Oslo
Companies formerly listed on the Oslo Stock Exchange
Norwegian companies established in 1988